Neil Harbisson (27 July 1982) is a Catalan-born British-Irish-American cyborg artist and activist for transpecies rights. He is best known for being the first person in the world with an antenna implanted in his skull. Since 2004, international media has described him as the world's first legally recognised cyborg and as the world's first cyborg artist. His antenna sends audible vibrations through his skull to report information to him. This includes measurements of electromagnetic radiation, phone calls, and music, as well as videos or images which are translated into audible vibrations. His WiFi-enabled antenna also allows him to receive signals and data from satellites.

In 2010, he co-founded the Cyborg Foundation, an international organisation that defends cyborg rights, promotes cyborg art and supports people who want to become cyborgs. In 2017, he co-founded the Transpecies Society, an association that gives voice to people with non-human identities, raises awareness of the challenges transpecies face, advocates for the freedom of self-design and offers the development of new senses and organs in community.

Early life 

Harbisson is the son of a Spanish mother and a Northern Irish father. He was born with achromat vision. He grew up in Barcelona where he studied piano and began to compose music at the age of 11. At 16, he studied fine art at the Institut Alexandre Satorras, where he was given special permission to use no colour in his work. His early works are all in black and white.

As a teenager, Harbisson lived in a tree for several days in Mataró to save the trees from being cut down. His initiative was supported by over 3,000 people who signed a petition to maintain the trees. After days of protest, the city hall announced the trees would not be cut.

At the age of 19, he moved to England to study music composition at Dartington College of Arts.

Works 

Harbisson defines his work as cyborg art, the art of designing new senses and new organs, and the art of merging with them. He compares his practice with sculpture; his aim is to mould his mind in order to create new perceptions of reality. He defines this particular branch of cyborg art as perceptionism, the art of designing new perceptions of reality and sees it as a post-art movement because its practicality makes no distinction between the artist, the work of art, the space where it exists and the audience. Harbisson is the artist, the work of art, the space where it exists, and the only one in the audience.

Sense of Colour: Cyborg Antenna 
The Cyborg Antenna is a sensory system created to extend color perception. It is implanted and osseointegrated in Harbisson's head and it sprouts from within his occipital bone. It has been permanently attached to Harbisson's head since 2004 and it allows him to feel and hear colours as audible vibrations inside his head, including colours invisible to the human eye such as infrareds and ultraviolets. The antenna also allows internet connection and therefore the reception of colour from other sensors or from satellites. Harbisson began developing the antenna at college in 2003 with Adam Montandon and it was upgraded by Peter Kese and Matias Lizana, among others. The antenna implant surgery was repeatedly rejected by bioethical committees but went underway regardless by anonymous doctors.

Harbisson has given permission to five friends, one in each continent, to send colours, images, videos or sounds directly into his head. If he receives colours while asleep his friends can colour and alter his dreams. The first public demonstration of a skull-transmitted image was broadcast live on Al Jazeera's chat show The Stream. The first person to make a phone call directly into his skull was Ruby Wax.In 2014, Harbisson executed the world's first skull-transmitted painting. Colours sent from audience members in Times Square as they painted simple coloured stripes onto a canvas were received live via internet directly into Harbisson's brain. He correctly identified and painted the same color stripes onto a canvas in front of an audience at The Red Door, 10 blocks away from Times Square.

Sense of Time: Solar Crown 
The Solar Crown is a sensory device for the sense of time. A rotating point of heat takes 24 hours to slowly orbit around Harbisson's head. When he feels the point of heat in the middle of his forehead it is midday solar time in London (longitude 0°), when the heat reaches his right ear it is midday in New Orleans (longitude 90°).  When his brain gets accustomed to the passage of time on his head, he will explore if he can modify his perception of time by altering the speed of rotation. Harbisson states that in the same way we can create optical illusions because we have eyes for the sense of sight, we should be able to create time illusions if we have an organ for the sense of time. If time illusions work, he will then be able to stretch or control his perception of time, age, and time travel.

Transdental Communication System: BlueTOOTH (Bluetooth Tooth) 
The transdental communication system is composed of two teeth, each containing a bluetooth enabled button and a mini vibrator. Whenever the button is pressed it sends a vibration to the other person's tooth. One tooth was installed in Harbisson's mouth and the other tooth in Moon Ribas's mouth. Both Harbisson and Ribas know how to communicate in morse code, therefore they are able to communicate from tooth to tooth. The first demonstration of the system was presented in São Paulo.

Performances and exhibitions 
Harbisson's artwork has been ranked together with the works of Yoko Ono and Marina Abramović as one of the 10 most shocking art performances ever. His work is focused on the creation of new senses and the creation of external artworks through these new senses. 
His main works have been exhibited during the 54th Venice Biennale at Palazzo Foscari (Venice, Italy), Savina Museum of Contemporary Art (Seoul, South Korea), 
Museumsquartier (Vienna, Austria), CCCB, Pioneer Works (New York, USA),ArtScience Museum (Singapore) Centre d'Art Santa Mònica (Barcelona, Spain), Pollock Gallery, Fake Me Hard (Niet Normaal INT), and at the American Visionary Art Museum, among others.

Harbisson has created a series of "Sound Portraits" by standing in front of a person and pointing his antenna at different parts of the face, writing down the different notes he hears and later creating a sound file. He has created live portraits of Philip Glass, Robert De Niro, Al Pacino, Iris Apfel, Oliver Stone, Steve Reich, Bono, Buzz Aldrin, Solange, Bill Viola, Prince Charles, Woody Allen, Antoni Tàpies, Leonardo DiCaprio, Judi Dench, Moby, James Cameron, Peter Brook, Al Gore, Tim Berners-Lee, Macy Gray, Gael García Bernal, Alfonso Cuarón, Ryoji Ikeda, Gabriel Byrne, Prince Albert II of Monaco, Steve Wozniak, Oliver Sacks, and Giorgio Moroder, among others.

Harbisson's "Colour Scores" are a series of paintings based on the transposition of sounds, music or voices into colour.

In 2009, Harbisson published the Human Colour Wheel based on the hue and light detected on hundreds of human skins from 2004 to 2009. The aim of the study was to state that humans are not black or white, but are different shades of orange - from very dark orange to very light orange.

Under the title Capital Colours, Harbisson has exhibited the dominant colours of different cities he has visited. He scans the colours of each city until he is able to represent it with at least two hues.

Media 
Harbisson has contributed significantly to the public awareness of cyborgs, transpecies, artificial senses, and human evolution by giving regular public lectures at universities, conferences and LAN parties sometimes to audiences of thousands. He has taken part in science, music, fashion, and art festivals such as the British Science Festival, TEDGlobal, London Fashion Week, and Sónar among others. He has become a trending topic on Twitter in several occasions.
In 2013, a short film about Neil Harbisson won the Grand Jury Prize at the Sundance Film Festival's Focus Forward Filmmakers Competition. Since 2014, a short fictional film about Harbisson's life is being filmed. In 2015, Hearing Colors, a black and white documentary about Harbisson in New York became a Vimeo "Staff Pick" and became the winner of New York's Tribeca Film Festival X Award in 2016.

He has appeared on documentaries by Discovery Channel, Documentos TV, Redes; in specific documentaries about his life and on a number of chat shows including NBC's Last Call with Carson Daly, Richard & Judy, Buenafuente, and Fantástico. He has taken part in radio shows on New York's Public Radio International, BBC World Service, Cadena SER, and has contributed in newspapers and magazines such as The New York Times, The New Scientist, Wired, and The Scientist, among others.

Harbisson appears in Aladdin, an independent film directed by Adam Green and starring Macaulay Culkin, Natasha Lyonne and Francesco Clemente among others.

Activism 
In 2004, Harbisson's British passport renewal was rejected. The UK Passport Office would not allow him to appear with an electronic device on his head. Harbisson wrote back explaining that he identified as a cyborg and that his antenna should be treated as an organ not a device. After weeks of correspondence, Harbisson's photo was accepted.

In 2011, during a demonstration in Barcelona, Harbisson's antenna was damaged by police who believed they were being filmed. Harbisson filed a complaint of physical aggression, not as damage to personal property, as he considers the antenna to be a body part.

Collaborations 
Harbisson has collaborated extensively with his childhood friend and cyborg artist Moon Ribas in performances and art projects. His first performances as a cyborg were at Dartington College of Arts, using pianos and collaborating with other students. He has performed with artist Pau Riba with whom he shared the same interest in cyborgs. They first performed in Barcelona followed by other performances. One of their projects is Avigram.

See also 
 Andy Warhol
 Moon Ribas
 Cyborg Foundation

References

External links 

 
 TED Global: "I listen to color" 
 Den Farben der Sonne lauschen. Wiener Zeitung Extra 25/26 July 2015.

 01
Spanish contemporary artists
People from Northern Ireland
1982 births
Living people
Cyborgs
Audiovisual artists
Artists from Catalonia
British artists
British composers
Alumni of Falmouth University
People associated with Falmouth University
Irish transhumanists
British transhumanists
Spanish transhumanists
Irish people of Spanish descent
British people of Catalan descent
British people of Spanish descent
Spanish people of Irish descent
Spanish people of British descent
Spanish people of Northern Ireland descent